Kian Maxwell Bytyci Brownfield (born 14 July 2002), known professionally as Kian (stylised in all caps; pronounced "Key-ahn") is an Australian singer and songwriter from Castlemaine, Victoria. He is best known for winning Triple J Unearthed in August 2018. His breakthrough single "Waiting" was polled at number 20 on Triple J's Hottest 100 of 2018.

Early life
Kian was born in July 2002 in the goldfield town of Castlemaine, Victoria, Australia. Since the age of three, Kian and his mother traveled on and off with his father making music in remote indigenous Australian communities. Kian's parents separated in 2010, although both parents are singer songwriters and passionate about music. hearing him sing at a very early age, Kian's mother and father saw his potential and he received his first guitar at the age of seven.

Music career

2017–2021: Early years and Bliss
In May 2017 Kian wrote and sang the chorus of Baker Boy's debut single "Cloud 9". The single's popularity kickstarted Kian's success.

In February 2018, Kian released "Too Far Gone" with 15-year-old Vince the Kid. In July, Kian released "Waiting" a song he wrote at the age of 14, with him explaining "It's about that feeling of uncertainty when you don't know if they like you back – I know it's childish but I reckon everyone has found themselves in this insecure hole at some point in their lives no matter what age. Hidden within the lyrics are some things that relate to me personally along with metaphorical things to move the story along." In August, Kian was announced the winner of the 2018 Triple J Unearthed. Since winning Triple J Unearthed, "Waiting" was added to high rotation and was being played on the more commercial radio station, Nova. In November, Kian signed a new recording deal with EMI Music in Australia and Republic Records for the rest of the world.

In February 2019, he released his third single "Childism" with Triple J getting an exclusive first listen. Kian explained that "It's about young people feeling like they don't have a place [in society] and we're stuck in the middle." The single was also written before "Waiting" was even thought of.

On 10 May 2019, Kian released his debut extended play Bliss. He also announced a tour for late-July into early-August. Following the release of Bliss, Kian released a series of stand-alone singles.

2022: Shine
In July 2022, Kian released "Shine", the title track and third single from his second extended play, released on 26 August 2022.

In March 2023, Kian united with Becca Hatch on the single "All of Me".

Discography

Extended plays

Singles

As lead artist

As featured artist

Awards and nominations

APRA Awards
The APRA Awards are held in Australia and New Zealand by the Australasian Performing Right Association to recognise songwriting skills, sales and airplay performance by its members annually. Kian has won two awards from two nominations.

|-
! scope="row" rowspan="2"| 2020
| rowspan="2"| "Waiting" (with Jerome Farah)
| Most Performed Australian Work of the Year
| rowspan="2" 
|-
| Most Performed Alternative Work of the Year
|-

ARIA Music Awards
The ARIA Music Awards is an annual award ceremony event celebrating the Australian music industry. Kian has been nominated for two awards.

! 
|-
! scope="row"| 2019
| "Waiting"
| Song of the Year
| 
|
|-
! scope="row"| 2020
| "Every Hour"
| Best Soul/R&B Release
| 
|
|-
! scope="row"| 2022
| Shine
| Best Soul/R&B Release
| 
| 
|-

J Awards
The J Awards are an annual series of Australian music awards that were established by the Australian Broadcasting Corporation's youth-focused radio station Triple J. They commenced in 2005. In 2017, Kian received a nomination for the Unearthed Artist of the Year Award.

|-
! scope="row"| 2018
| Himself
| Unearthed Artist of the Year
|

Music Victoria Awards
The Music Victoria Awards are an annual awards night celebrating Victorian music. They commenced in 2006.

! 
|-
| Music Victoria Awards of 2019
| Kian
| Best Regional Act/Outer Suburban Act
| 
| 
|-

References

2002 births
21st-century Australian musicians
APRA Award winners
Living people
Singer-songwriters
21st-century Australian male musicians